The meridian 120° west of Greenwich is a line of longitude that extends from the North Pole across the Arctic Ocean, North America, the Pacific Ocean, the Southern Ocean, and Antarctica to the South Pole.

The 120th meridian west forms a great circle with the 60th meridian east.

In Canada the border between British Columbia and Alberta is defined by the meridian north of where it intersects the Continental Divide of the Americas, and in the United States part of the border between California and Nevada follows it.

The mean solar time at this meridian determines the time for the Pacific Time Zone (UTC−08:00) during standard time. Most of the year however, it is the meridian for Alaska Daylight Time, as daylight saving time is observed for ⅔ of the year.

From Pole to Pole
Starting at the North Pole and heading south to the South Pole, the 120th meridian west passes through:

{| class="wikitable plainrowheaders"
! scope="col" width="130" | Co-ordinates
! scope="col" | Country, territory or sea
! scope="col" | Notes
|-
| style="background:#b0e0e6;" | 
! scope="row" style="background:#b0e0e6;" | Arctic Ocean
| style="background:#b0e0e6;" |
|-
| 
! scope="row" | 
| Northwest Territories — Prince Patrick Island
|-
| style="background:#b0e0e6;" | 
! scope="row" style="background:#b0e0e6;" | M'Clure Strait
| style="background:#b0e0e6;" |
|-
| 
! scope="row" | 
| Northwest Territories — Banks Island
|-valign="top"
| style="background:#b0e0e6;" | 
! scope="row" style="background:#b0e0e6;" | Prince of Wales Strait
| style="background:#b0e0e6;" |
|-
| style="background:#b0e0e6;" | 
! scope="row" style="background:#b0e0e6;" | Amundsen Gulf
| style="background:#b0e0e6;" |
|-valign="top"
| 
! scope="row" | 
|-valign="top"
| 
! scope="row" | 
|-
| style="background:#b0e0e6;" | 
! scope="row" style="background:#b0e0e6;" | Pacific Ocean
| style="background:#b0e0e6;" | Santa Barbara Channel
|-
| 
! scope="row" | 
| California — Santa Rosa Island
|-
| style="background:#b0e0e6;" | 
! scope="row" style="background:#b0e0e6;" | Pacific Ocean
| style="background:#b0e0e6;" | 
|-
| style="background:#b0e0e6;" | 
! scope="row" style="background:#b0e0e6;" | Southern Ocean
| style="background:#b0e0e6;" |
|-
| 
! scope="row" | Antarctica
| Unclaimed territory
|-
|}

See also
119th meridian west
121st meridian west

w120 meridian west
Borders of Alberta
Borders of British Columbia
Borders of California
Borders of Nevada